Inga grazielae is a species of plant in the family Fabaceae. It is found only in Brazil at altitudes below 100 meters.

References

grazielae
Flora of Brazil
Vulnerable plants
Taxonomy articles created by Polbot